Akhduʿ Asfal is a sub-district located in the Maqbanah District, Taiz Governorate, Yemen. Akhduʿ Asfal had a population of 3,540 according to the 2004 census.

References  

Sub-districts in Maqbanah District